NICD may refer to:
National Institute for Communicable Diseases, South Africa, part of the National Health Laboratory Service
Nickel–cadmium battery (NiCd), a rechargeable battery
South Shore Line (NICTD) (reporting mark NICD), an interurban commuter rail line in Chicago and northern Indiana
N-formylmaleamate deformylase, an enzyme